616 Wilford Lane is a 2021 horror film written and directed by Mark S. Allen and Dante Yore. It stars John Littlefield, Eric Roberts, Alyson Gorske, and Jessica Chancellor. The film is about a widower who relocates his two teen daughters to a charming town, and into their dream home, which quickly becomes a nightmare.

Premise
After a tragedy, David moves his two teen daughters, Randy and Staci, to the charming town of Auburn, California, and into a dream house. However, the family finds that some things follow you, no matter how hard you try to outrun them.

Cast
 John Littlefield as Jim
 Eric Roberts as David
 Alyson Gorske as Staci
 Stevonte Fitzgerald Hart as Miles
 Eliza Roberts as Joan
 Jasmine Waltz as Austyn
 Jessica Chancellor as Randy
 John Michael Herrmann as Matt
 Nadine Stenovitch as Robin
 Don Scribner as Sheriff
 Rich Vogt as Deputy Boyle

Release
The film was released in the United States on May 18, 2021.

References

External links
 

2021 films
2021 horror films
American teen horror films
Films impacted by the COVID-19 pandemic
2020s English-language films
2020s American films